Basketball at the 2013 Islamic Solidarity Games will be held in GOR PSCC Palembang in Palembang from 15 September to 20 September 2013.

Medalists

Medal table

Men

Women

References

External links
 Basketball Official Website

Islamic Solidarity Games
2013 Islamic Solidarity Games
Islamic Solidarity Games
2013